Guddal is a village in Fjaler Municipality in Vestland county, Norway. The village is the site of Guddal Church, which serves the whole valley. The local economy is centered on agriculture and forestry.

References

Villages in Vestland
Fjaler